Samuel Emanful Arkah was a Ghanaian politician. He was a member of parliament for the Wassaw Central constituency from 1954 to 1965 and the member of parliament for the Prestea constituency from 1965 until 1966 when the Nkrumah government was overthrown.

See also
 List of MLAs elected in the 1954 Gold Coast legislative election
 List of MLAs elected in the 1956 Gold Coast legislative election
 List of MPs elected in the 1965 Ghanaian parliamentary election

References

Date of birth missing
Date of death missing
Ghanaian MPs 1954–1956
Ghanaian MPs 1956–1965
Ghanaian MPs 1965–1966
Convention People's Party (Ghana) politicians
20th-century Ghanaian politicians